Jatunjasa (possibly from Quechua hatun big, q'asa mountain pass, "big mountain pass"), also known as Incachiriasca (possibly from Inka Inca, chiriyasqa cooled, "cooled Inca"), is a  mountain in the Vilcabamba mountain range in the Andes of Peru. It is located in the Cusco Region, Anta Province, Limatambo District, and in the Urubamba Province, Ollantaytambo District. Jatunjasa lies south of Salcantay.

References

Mountains of Peru
Mountains of Cusco Region